The Legacy (literally "the heirs") is a Danish television drama created by Maya Ilsøe and produced by DR. Series 1 was first broadcast on the Danish national television channel DR1 on 1 January 2014, and was sold to a number of other countries worldwide even before it had aired in Denmark. The series is a modern family portrait which tells the story of four siblings trying to cope with their mother's death which has turned all of their lives upside down. After the success of the 10-episode first series, a second season of seven more episodes started broadcast on Danish television on 1 January 2015, and a third series of nine episodes started in January 2017.

Plot

Series 1
The Legacy starts out at the legendary manor Grønnegaard on southern Funen, where the internationally renowned artist Veronika Grønnegaard has lived an eccentric and colorful life since the wild sixties. The serial follows Veronika's four adult children whose free and chaotic childhood at Grønnegaard has left its mark on them in very different ways. They live scattered to the four winds until Veronika unexpectedly dies and they are forced to gather to wind up the estate. Just before she dies, Veronika leaves the manor to her daughter Signe, who was given up for adoption. Signe lives with her partner in a quiet residential area in the local town and has never known the truth of her parentage. What was meant to be a quick and painless estate division becomes the start of a journey into secrets and lies that turn their lives upside down and forces them to look at each other and themselves with new eyes.

Series 2
Series 2 has been screened.

Series 3
The third and final season was aired weekly in January and February 2017 at Danmarks Radio.

Cast

References

External links
 
 Official Danish website of Arvingerne

2010s Danish television series
2014 Danish television series debuts
DR television dramas
Danish drama television series
Television shows set in Denmark
Danish-language television shows